Eugen Anton Theophil von Podbielski  (17 October 1814 – 31 October 1879) was a general in the Prussian Army. He was born in Köpenick and originally was a cavalry officer. Podbielski served as Quartermaster-General of the German General Staff during the Austro-Prussian War and again the Franco-Prussian War. As such he was the operations officer and Deputy Chief of Staff. Afterwards he was made Inspector-General of Artillery and became the namesake of the 5th (1st Silesian) Field Artillery Regiment. He eventually was promoted to General of the Cavalry. Having five daughters; his son Victor von Podbielski became a general as well and served as a Prussian minister afterwards. Theophil von Podbielski died in Berlin.

See also
Podbielskiallee (Berlin U-Bahn)

1814 births
1879 deaths
Generals of Cavalry (Prussia)
German military personnel of the Franco-Prussian War
Military personnel from Berlin
People from the Province of Brandenburg
Prussian nobility
Prussian people of the Austro-Prussian War
People from Treptow-Köpenick
Recipients of the Pour le Mérite (military class)